Sebergham is a civil parish in the Borough of Allerdale in Cumbria, England.  It contains 33 listed buildings that are recorded in the National Heritage List for England.  Of these, four are listed at Grade II*, the middle of the three grades, and the others are at Grade II, the lowest grade.  The parish contains the village of Sebergham and the hamlet of Welton, and is otherwise rural.  Most of the listed buildings are houses and associated structures, farmhouses and farm buildings.  The other listed buildings include a medieval church, former mills, bridges, and a boundary stone.


Key

Buildings

References

Citations

Sources

Lists of listed buildings in Cumbria
Inglewood Forest